Coppa Federale Siciliana (which translates as the Sicilian Federal Cup) was a Sicilian football competition which took place during May 1920. The tournament took place just once, in the aftermath of World War I. The winners of the competition were Palermo.

Sicilian football clubs were not entered into the Italian Football Championship after the war and the tournament was organized in an attempt to set up a viable alternative for the four main clubs on the island at the time; Palermo, Messinese, Catanese and Marsala. A couple of notable ommissons from the competition were Trapani and Paternò.

Semi-finals

(*) result uncertain, either 9-1 or 2-0 in favour of Messinese.

(**) Could be non-disputed because of problems with stadium.

Final

First Leg

Second Leg

Messinese: Lucchesi, Prestamburgo, Nebbia, Fulci, Stracuzzi, Starvaggi, De Zardo, Barone, Gallina, De Nicola, Allegra.

Palermo: De Lucia, Bottega, Mannino, Sichera, Trabucco, Pirandello, Grippi, Aliotta, Brancaleone, Ferro, Frangipane. 

Referee: Peregalli.

References

Sport in Sicily